The Metropolitan Borough of Rotherham is a metropolitan borough of South Yorkshire, England. It is named after its largest town, Rotherham, but also spans the outlying towns of Maltby, Swinton, Wath-upon-Dearne, Dinnington and also the villages of Rawmarsh and Laughton. A large valley also spans the entire borough. Locally known as the Rother Valley.

The district was formed on 1 April 1974, under the Local Government Act 1972, as a merger of the County Borough of Rotherham, with Maltby, Rawmarsh, Swinton and Wath-upon-Dearne urban districts along with Rotherham Rural District and Kiveton Park Rural District.

Rotherham Metropolitan Borough Council is one of the safest Labour councils in the United Kingdom, although the number of Labour council seats dropped from 92% to 79% in 2014 following the Rotherham child sexual exploitation scandal.

Geography
Settlements in the borough of Rotherham include:

Anston, Aston, Aughton
Bramley, Brampton, Brampton-en-le-Morthen, Brinsworth, Brecks, Brookhouse, Broom
Canklow, Carr, Catcliffe, Clifton
Dinnington
East Dene, East Herringthorpe, Eastwood
Firbeck, Flanderwell
Gildingwells, Greasbrough
Harthill, Harley, Hellaby, Herringthorpe
Kimberworth, Kimberworth Park, Kiveton Park
Laughton-en-le-Morthen, Letwell
Maltby, Manvers, Masbrough, Moorgate, Morthen
Parkgate
Ravenfield, Rawmarsh, Ryecroft
Scholes, Slade Hooton, Stone  Swallownest, Swinton, Sunnyside
Templeborough, Thorpe Hesley, Thorpe Salvin, Thrybergh, Thurcroft, Todwick, Treeton
Ulley
Wales, Wath-upon-Dearne, Waverley, Wellgate, Wentworth, West Melton, Whiston, Wickersley, Woodsetts

The borough borders City of Sheffield, Metropolitan Borough of Barnsley, City of Doncaster, Bassetlaw District in Nottinghamshire and North East Derbyshire and Bolsover District in Derbyshire. The borough is also close to the cities of Sheffield, Doncaster, Lincoln, Hull, Leeds, Bradford, Wakefield, Nottingham, Manchester and Derby.

Demographics

Ethnicity

Council elections

The Metropolitan Borough of Rotherham was founded in 1974, and Labour have been in control of the council since the first election.

Notes

References

External links
Rotherham - The Unofficial Website

 
Local government districts in South Yorkshire
Metropolitan boroughs